Alberni was a provincial electoral district in the Canadian province of British Columbia. It originally appeared in the 1890 election and then, after being merged into Cowichan-Alberni for the 1894 election, was renamed Alberni riding in the election of 1898. The riding lasted by that name until 1933 and 1937, when the name Alberni-Nanaimo was used. In 1941 the Alberni riding name was restored.  After a redistribution, the area became part of the riding of Alberni-Qualicum.

Electoral history
Note: Winners in each election are in bold.

|-

|- bgcolor="white"
!align="right" colspan=3|Total valid votes
!align="right"|41
!align="right"|100.00%
!align="right"|
|- bgcolor="white"
!align="right" colspan=3|Total rejected ballots
!align="right"|
!align="right"|
!align="right"|
|- bgcolor="white"
!align="right" colspan=3|Turnout
!align="right"|%
!align="right"|
!align="right"|
|}

In the seventh general election of 1894, the Alberni riding was merged with the Cowichan riding to form Cowichan-Alberni. The separate riding names were restored for the 1898 election.

|-

|- bgcolor="white"
!align="right" colspan=3|Total valid votes
!align="right"|178
!align="right"|100.00%
!align="right"|
|- bgcolor="white"
!align="right" colspan=3|Total rejected ballots
!align="right"|
!align="right"|
!align="right"|
|- bgcolor="white"
!align="right" colspan=3|Turnout
!align="right"|%
!align="right"|
!align="right"|
|}

|-

|- bgcolor="white"
!align="right" colspan=3|Total valid votes
!align="right"|198
!align="right"|100.00%

|-

|- bgcolor="white"
!align="right" colspan=3|Total valid votes
!align="right"|422
!align="right"|100.00%
!align="right"|
|- bgcolor="white"
!align="right" colspan=3|Total rejected ballots
!align="right"|
!align="right"|
!align="right"|
|- bgcolor="white"
!align="right" colspan=3|Turnout
!align="right"|%
!align="right"|
!align="right"|
|}

|-

|- bgcolor="white"
!align="right" colspan=3|Total valid votes
!align="right"|483
!align="right"|100.00%
!align="right"|
|- bgcolor="white"
!align="right" colspan=3|Total rejected ballots
!align="right"|
!align="right"|
!align="right"|
|- bgcolor="white"
!align="right" colspan=3|Turnout
!align="right"|%
!align="right"|
!align="right"|
|}

|-

|- bgcolor="white"
!align="right" colspan=3|Total valid votes
!align="right"|549
!align="right"|100.00%
!align="right"|
|- bgcolor="white"
!align="right" colspan=3|Total rejected ballots
!align="right"|
!align="right"|
!align="right"|
|- bgcolor="white"
!align="right" colspan=3|Turnout
!align="right"|%
!align="right"|
!align="right"|
|}

|-

|- bgcolor="white"
!align="right" colspan=3|Total valid votes
!align="right"|n/a
!align="right"|- %
!align="right"|
|- bgcolor="white"
!align="right" colspan=3|Total rejected ballots
!align="right"|
!align="right"|
!align="right"|
|- bgcolor="white"
!align="right" colspan=3|Turnout
!align="right"|%
!align="right"|
!align="right"|
|}

|-

|Independent
|Alan Webster Neill
|align="right"|253
|align="right"|25.27%
|align="right"|
|align="right"|unknown

|- bgcolor="white"
!align="right" colspan=3|Total valid votes
!align="right"|1,001
!align="right"|100.00%
!align="right"|
|- bgcolor="white"
!align="right" colspan=3|Total rejected ballots
!align="right"|
!align="right"|
!align="right"|
|- bgcolor="white"
!align="right" colspan=3|Turnout
!align="right"|%
!align="right"|
!align="right"|
|}

|- bgcolor="white"
!align="right" colspan=3|Total valid votes
!align="right"|1,949 
!align="right"|100.00%

Alberni riding disappeared with redistribution following the 1928 election. Its successor in the 1933 and 1937 elections was Alberni-Nanaimo. For the 1941 election the Alberni riding name was restored:
 	 	 	 	 

|-
 
|Co-operative Commonwealth Fed.
|Thomas Speakman Barnett
|align="right"|1,258 	
|align="right"|31.83%
|align="right"|
|align="right"|unknown

|- bgcolor="white"
!align="right" colspan=3|Total valid votes
!align="right"|3,952
!align="right"|100.00%
!align="right"|
|- bgcolor="white"
!align="right" colspan=3|Total rejected ballots
!align="right"|74
!align="right"|
!align="right"|
|- bgcolor="white"
!align="right" colspan=3|Turnout
!align="right"|%
!align="right"|
!align="right"|
|}

|-

|Independent
|James Mowat
|align="right"|3,290	
|align="right"|42.84	%
|align="right"|
|align="right"|unknown
 
|Co-operative Commonwealth Fed.
|Jack Whittall
|align="right"|2,129 	
|align="right"|27.72%
|align="right"|
|align="right"|unknown
|- bgcolor="white"
!align="right" colspan=3|Total valid votes
!align="right"|7,679 	
!align="right"|100.00%
!align="right"|
|- bgcolor="white"
!align="right" colspan=3|Total rejected ballots
!align="right"|200
!align="right"|
!align="right"|
|- bgcolor="white"
!align="right" colspan=3|Turnout
!align="right"|%
!align="right"|
!align="right"|
|}

|-

|align="right"|
|align="right"|unknown

|align="right"|
|align="right"|unknown

 
|Co-operative Commonwealth Fed.
|Stanley John Squire
|align="right"|3,067
|align="right"|38.29%
|align="right"|4,054
|align="right"|57.23%
|align="right"|
|align="right"|unknown
|- bgcolor="white"
!align="right" colspan=3|Total valid votes
!align="right"|8,009 
!align="right"|100.00%
!align="right"|7,084
|align="right"|
|align="right"|
|- bgcolor="white"
!align="right" colspan=3|Total rejected ballots
!align="right"|246
!align="right"|
!align="right"|
!align="right"|
!align="right"|
|- bgcolor="white"
!align="right" colspan=3|Turnout
!align="right"|%
!align="right"|
!align="right"|
!align="right"|
!align="right"|
|- bgcolor="white"
!align="right" colspan=9|1 Preferential ballot. First and final of four counts shown only.
|}
 	 	 	 	 	 

|-

|align="right"|
|align="right"|unknown

 
|Co-operative Commonwealth Fed.
|Stanley John Squire
|align="right"|3,116 	 	
|align="right"|43.07%
|align="right"|3,715
|align="right"|56.93%
|align="right"|
|align="right"|unknown
|- bgcolor="white"
!align="right" colspan=3|Total valid votes
!align="right"|7,234 	 	 
!align="right"|100.00%
!align="right"|6,526 
|align="right"|
|align="right"|
|- bgcolor="white"
!align="right" colspan=3|Total rejected ballots
!align="right"|336
!align="right"|
!align="right"|
|- bgcolor="white"
!align="right" colspan=3|Turnout
!align="right"|%
!align="right"|
!align="right"|
|- bgcolor="white"
!align="right" colspan=9|1 Preferential ballot. First and final of four counts shown only.
|}	 	 	 	

|-

 
|Co-operative Commonwealth Fed.
|Stanley John Squire
|align="right"|3,362 	 	 	
|align="right"|50.60%
|align="right"|
|align="right"|unknown
|- bgcolor="white"
!align="right" colspan=3|Total valid votes
!align="right"|6,644	
!align="right"|100.00%
!align="right"|
|- bgcolor="white"
!align="right" colspan=3|Total rejected ballots
!align="right"|80
!align="right"|
!align="right"|
|- bgcolor="white"
!align="right" colspan=3|Turnout
!align="right"|%
!align="right"|
!align="right"|
|} 	 	 	 	

|-

 
|Co-operative Commonwealth Fed.
|Stanley John Squire
|align="right"|4,093 	 	 	
|align="right"|45.05%
|align="right"|
|align="right"|unknown
|- bgcolor="white"
!align="right" colspan=3|Total valid votes
!align="right"|9,085
!align="right"|100.00%
!align="right"|
|- bgcolor="white"
!align="right" colspan=3|Total rejected ballots
!align="right"|315
!align="right"|
!align="right"|
|- bgcolor="white"
!align="right" colspan=3|Turnout
!align="right"|%
!align="right"|
!align="right"|
|}

 	 	 	 

|-

|- bgcolor="white"
!align="right" colspan=3|Total valid votes
!align="right"|8,826
!align="right"|100.00%
!align="right"|
|- bgcolor="white"
!align="right" colspan=3|Total rejected ballots
!align="right"|68
!align="right"|
!align="right"|
|- bgcolor="white"
!align="right" colspan=3|Turnout
!align="right"|%
!align="right"|
!align="right"|
|}

|-

|- bgcolor="white"
!align="right" colspan=3|Total valid votes
!align="right"|10,871
!align="right"|100.00%
!align="right"|
|- bgcolor="white"
!align="right" colspan=3|Total rejected ballots
!align="right"|95
!align="right"|
!align="right"|
|- bgcolor="white"
!align="right" colspan=3|Turnout
!align="right"|%
!align="right"|
!align="right"|
|}

|-

|- bgcolor="white"
!align="right" colspan=3|Total valid votes
!align="right"|15,313
!align="right"|100.00%
!align="right"|
|- bgcolor="white"
!align="right" colspan=3|Total rejected ballots
!align="right"|131
!align="right"|
!align="right"|
|- bgcolor="white"
!align="right" colspan=3|Turnout
!align="right"|%
!align="right"|
!align="right"|
|}
 	 	 	 	 

|-

|- bgcolor="white"
!align="right" colspan=3|Total valid votes
!align="right"|17,579 
!align="right"|100.00%
!align="right"|
|- bgcolor="white"
!align="right" colspan=3|Total rejected ballots
!align="right"|251
!align="right"|
!align="right"|
|- bgcolor="white"
!align="right" colspan=3|Turnout
!align="right"|%
!align="right"|
!align="right"|
|}

|-

|- bgcolor="white"
!align="right" colspan=3|Total valid votes
!align="right"|19,967 
!align="right"|100.00%
!align="right"|
|- bgcolor="white"
!align="right" colspan=3|Total rejected ballots
!align="right"|226
!align="right"|
!align="right"|
|- bgcolor="white"
!align="right" colspan=3|Turnout
!align="right"|%
!align="right"|
!align="right"|
|}

|-

|- bgcolor="white"
!align="right" colspan=3|Total valid votes
!align="right"|13,768 	
!align="right"|100.00%
!align="right"|
|- bgcolor="white"
!align="right" colspan=3|Total rejected ballots
!align="right"|201
!align="right"|
!align="right"|
|- bgcolor="white"
!align="right" colspan=3|Turnout
!align="right"|%
!align="right"|
!align="right"|
|}

|-

|- bgcolor="white"
!align="right" colspan=3|Total valid votes
!align="right"|14,718 		
!align="right"|100.00%
!align="right"|
|- bgcolor="white"
!align="right" colspan=3|Total rejected ballots
!align="right"|244
!align="right"|
!align="right"|
|- bgcolor="white"
!align="right" colspan=3|Turnout
!align="right"|%
!align="right"|
!align="right"|
|}

The riding was redistributed after the 1996 election. The main successor riding is Alberni-Qualicum.

Sources
Elections BC historical returns

Former provincial electoral districts of British Columbia on Vancouver Island